The Church of Jesus Christ of Latter-day Saints in Ukraine refers to the Church of Jesus Christ of Latter-day Saints and its members in Ukraine.   In January 1991, there were 40 members in one congregation in Ukraine.  In December 2021, there were 11,216 members in 46 congregations.

History

Since 1922, Ukraine was part of the Union of Soviet Socialist Republics (USSR) under communist control, which restricted most religious institutions.  Near the end of the Soviet Union, a new law was passed granting freedom of individual religious practice and allowing independent religious organizations.  During this time of change, the first LDS missionaries arrived in Ukraine.  The president of the Austria Vienna East Mission, Howard L. Biddulph, visited in June 1991 and Ukraine's first branch was organized in Kyiv with 40 members.  In September of that year, Boyd K. Packer and Dallin H. Oaks of the Quorum of the Twelve Apostles visited, so that Packer could dedicate the nation for missionary preaching, and the LDS Church was officially registered with the Ukrainian government.  In early 1992, shortly after Ukraine's secession from the Soviet Union, the Ukraine Kyiv Mission was created with 35 missionaries, and Biddulph serving as its first president.  Another mission was created in Donetsk in July 1993.

Until June 28, 1998 the LDS Church did not have its own meetinghouses in Ukraine, so church services were held in rented buildings with baptisms being performed in the Dnieper River or in swimming pools.  In the early years, the church sought to offer aide to the Ukrainian nation by organizing humanitarian donations of food and clothing from members in the United States and Germany from 1992–1993, and a large donation of medical supplies in 1995.

The church announced in 1998 that it planned to construct a temple somewhere in Kyiv.  This would be the second temple in Eastern Europe, after the Freiberg Germany Temple, which was the closest temple for Ukrainian members.  However, construction was postponed due to delays in acquiring the needed land.  Ground was finally broken in 2007, and the temple was completed and dedicated on August 29, 2010.  The Kyiv Ukraine Temple was to accommodate members from Armenia, Belarus, Bulgaria, Georgia, Kazakhstan, Moldova, Romania, Russia, and Ukraine.

On May 30, 2004, the Kyiv Ukraine Stake, Ukraine's first, was organized.

During the 2014 pro-Russian unrest in Ukraine, all missionaries of the Ukraine Donetsk Mission were removed from the country and reassigned elsewhere. Because of slowing of convert baptisms in previous years, the Ukraine L'viv Mission was closed in 2018.

On January 24, 2022, due to Ukraine-Russia tensions, the LDS Church announced that out of abundance of caution, full-time missionaries assigned to both the Ukraine Dnipro and Ukraine Kyiv/Moldova missions were being temporarily reassigned to locations outside of Ukraine. This follows a statement from the US State department recommending all U.S. citizens in Ukraine depart the country promptly On February February 16, 2022, Representatives of the LDS Church took part in celebrations for the Day of Unity. On February 22, 2022 the Europe East Area Presidency released a statement saying they understand the challenges facing Ukrainians and that the church in Ukraine remains open. As of February 24, 2022, the Kyiv Ukraine Temple was closed until further notice according to its official website.

Stakes and Districts
As of February 2022, the following congregations were located in Ukraine:
Donetsk Ukraine District
Kharkiv Ukraine Stake
Kyiv Ukraine Stake
L'viv Ukraine District
Odessa Ukraine District
Simferopol Russia District

Missions

Ukraine Dnipro Mission
Ukraine Donetsk Mission (closed in 2014)
Ukraine Kyiv Mission
Ukraine Lviv Mission (closed in 2018)

Temples
The Kyiv Ukraine Temple was announced in 1998, then completed and dedicated in 2010.

See also

Religion in Ukraine

References

External links
 Newsroom - Ukraine
 ComeUntoChrist.org Latter-day Saints Visitor site
 The Church of Jesus Christ of Latter-day Saints Official site
 A History of The Church of Jesus Christ of Latter-day Saints in Ukraine